A RAID level is any of the possible configurations of a RAID disk array. RAID stands for redundant array of independent disks (or, formerly, redundant array of inexpensive disks).

RAID levels may refer to:

 Standard RAID levels, all the RAID configurations defined in the Common RAID Disk Drive Format standard, which is maintained by the Storage Networking Industry Association
 Nested RAID levels, RAID configurations that incorporate features of two or more standard RAID levels
 Non-standard RAID levels, variants of standard or nested RAID levels. Non-standard RAID levels deviate from the standard configurations defined by the Storage Networking Industry Association (SNIA).

See also
 Non-RAID drive architectures

RAID